The buff-fronted foliage-gleaner (Dendroma rufa) is a species of bird in the family Furnariidae, the ovenbirds. It is found in southeastern regions of South America in the cerrado and pantanal of Brazil and Paraguay as well as areas of southeast coastal Brazil; also extreme northeast Argentina. In western Andean and northwest South America, it is found in Venezuela, Colombia, Ecuador, Peru and Bolivia; and in the northwest, it is also found in Panama and Costa Rica.

Its natural habitats are subtropical or tropical moist lowland forest and subtropical or tropical moist montane forest.

References

Further reading

External links
Videos, photos and sounds - Internet Bird Collection
Photo gallery - VIREO
Species factsheet - BirdLife International

}
buff-fronted foliage-gleaner
Birds of Costa Rica
Birds of Brazil
Birds of Venezuela
Birds of the Northern Andes
buff-fronted foliage-gleaner
Taxa named by Louis Jean Pierre Vieillot
Taxonomy articles created by Polbot
Taxobox binomials not recognized by IUCN